Zanaki (Ikizanaki) is a Bantu language of Tanzania. It is spoken by the Zanaki people of Musoma and was the first language of Tanzanian president Julius Nyerere, son of the King Burito Nyerere (1860–1942).

References

Languages of Tanzania
Great Lakes Bantu languages